Léon Bel (28 July 1878 – 19 July 1957) was a French businessman.

Early life
Léon Bel was born on 28 July 1878 in Orgelet in rural France. His father, Jules Bel, was a cheese maker who created the Bel Group.

He served in the French Army during World War I.

Career
Bel took over the Bel Group from his father. With Swiss cheese makers, he learned how to make cheese that would keep. In 1921, he launched the brand known as The Laughing Cow.

Death
He died on 19 July 1957 in Paris, France.

References

1878 births
1957 deaths
People from Franche-Comté
Businesspeople from Paris
Cheesemakers
French military personnel of World War I